This is a list of heritage railways in Australia, some of which can also be considered tourist railways. For convenience, heritage tramways have also been included. Most are members of Association of Tourist & Heritage Rail Australia (ATHRA). In addition to active operations, abandoned and putative operations are also included, but static museum sites and rolling stock operators without a 'dedicated' line do not fall within Wikipedia's definition of heritage railways. Miniature railways with gauges of less than 380mm (15 in) are excluded. Lines named in red are lacking a detailed Wikipedia entry.

The world's second preserved railway, and the first outside the United Kingdom, was Australia's Puffing Billy Railway.

New South Wales

 gauge unless otherwise stated. See also Transport Heritage NSW

 Byron Bay Train 
 Campbelltown Narrow Gauge Railway— gauge 
 Cooma Monaro Railway (railway not yet operational)
 Crookwell Heritage Railway (railway not yet operational)
 Dorrigo Steam Railway & Museum (railway not yet operational)

 Glenreagh Mountain Railway[  (railway not yet operational)

 Illawarra Light Railway Museum— gauge 

 Kandos-Rysltone Heritage Railway
 Katoomba Scenic Railway—1,275mm (4 ft 2in) gauge  (steepest railway in Australia—strictly, an inclined lift rather than a funicular)

 Ladysmith Tourist Railway (rail bike rides within static museum site)
 Lake Macquarie Light Rail—Toronto— gauge (privately owned—not open to public)
 Lithgow State Mine Railway (railway not yet operational)
 Michelago Tourist Railway (railway operation ceased from 2006)
 Newington Armory Railway–Olympic Park— gauge  (railway operation suspended from 2020; undergoing up-grading work prior to reopening )
 NSW Rail Museum—Thirlmere
 Oberon Tarana Heritage Railway (railway not yet operational)

 Richmond Vale Railway Museum

 Skitube
 Sydney Tramway Museum
 Timbertown Heritage Railway, Wauchope—595mm (2 ft) gauge 

 Zig Zag Railway— gauge  (railway operation suspended from 2012—not yet operational again)

Northern Territory 
 gauge 
 Adelaide River and Snake Creek Railway, Adelaide River  (project abandoned)
 Ghan Preservation Society ("The Old Ghan"), Alice Springs  (railway operation ceased from 2001)

Queensland
 gauge unless otherwise stated.
 Archer Park Rail Museum, Rockhampton   
 Atherton—Herberton Historic Railway

 Australian Sugar Cane Railway, Bundaberg— gauge.
 Bally Hooley Steam Railway, Port Douglas— gauge.
 Beaudesert Rail (railway operation ceased from 2003)
 Big Pineapple Railway, Woombye— gauge. (railway operation suspended as at December 2022 )
 Brisbane Tramway Museum, Ferny Grove— gauge. (ride within static museum site)
 Burrum Mining Museum, Howard— gauge. (ride within static museum site)
 Downs Explorer, Warwick  (run excursions over freight-only sections of state system, from Warwick to Stanthorpe, Wallangarra, Clifton, Wheatvale, Hendon, Toowoomba, Goondiwindi)
 DownsSteam Tourist Railway & Museum, Drayton, Toowoomba   (a plan to run excursions over sections of the state system is not yet operational)
 Dreamworld Railway, Coomera— gauge. (little more than a funfair railway)
 Ginger Train, Yandina— gauge.
 Gulflander : Croydon–Normanton.
 Kuranda Scenic Railway : Cairns–Kuranda.

 Mary Valley Rattler          (previously known as Mary Valley Heritage Railway and The Valley Rattler)
 Mary Ann Steam Train, Maryborough  

 Queensland Pioneer Steam Railway (also known as Swanbank Railway)

 Ravenshoe Railway Company (railway operation suspended from December 2020  - plans for reopening in progress)
 Rosewood Railway (railway operation suspended as at December 2022 )
 Savannahlander—Cairns–Forsayth.
 Sea World Railway, Main Beach— gauge. (railway operation ceased by 2022; not to be confused with monorail which also ceased from 2022 )
 Southern Downs Steam Railway—former name of Downs Explorer, q.v. above
 Swanbank Railway—see Queensland Pioneer Steam Railway (above)

 Woodford Railway, Woodford— gauge. (previously known as Durundur Railway  )

South Australia
 unless otherwise noted

 Cobdogla Irrigation and Steam Museum Railway— gauge. (railway operation suspended from December 2022 )

 Moonta Mines Tourist Railway— gauge.
 National Railway Museum, Port Adelaide—457mm (1 ft 6 in) gauge. 
 Pichi Richi Railway— gauge.
 Semaphore to Fort Glanville Tourist Railway—457mm (1 ft 6 in) gauge. (associated with National Railway Museum, see above)
 South Australian Light Railway Centre, Port Milang— gauge.
 SteamRanger Heritage Railway

 Tramway Museum, St Kilda— gauge.
 Victor Harbor Horse Drawn Tram

Tasmania 

 gauge unless otherwise stated.
 Bush Mill Railway— gauge. (railway operation ceased from 2004)
 Derwent Valley Railway (railway operation ceased from 2005, not yet restored to operation)
 Don River Railway
 Ida Bay Railway, Lune River (railway operation suspended from 2018, not yet operational again )
 Launceston & North East Railway (railway  not yet operational)
 Launceston Tramway Museum 
 Railtrack Riders, Maydena  (rail bikes on National Park—Florentine line)
 Redwater Creek Railway— gauge. (formerly Redwater Creek Heritage Museum)

 Wee Georgie Wood Steam Railway, Tullah— gauge.
 West Coast Wilderness Railway

Victoria

 unless otherwise noted
 Alexandra Timber Tramway— gauge.
 Ballarat Tramway Museum— gauge.
 Bendigo Tramways— gauge.
 Bellarine Railway— gauge.
 Coal Creek Bush Tramway— gauge. (railway operation ceased)
 Daylesford Spa Country Railway
 Kerrisdale Mountain Railway & Museum— gauge.
 Melbourne Tramcar Preservation, Haddon  (tramway operation ceased)
 Mornington Railway
 Portland Cable Tram— gauge.
 Puffing Billy Railway— gauge.
 Red Cliffs Historical Steam Railway— gauge.
 South Gippsland Railway (railway operation ceased from January 2016)
 Tramway Heritage Centre, Byland  (tramway operation ceased 2009)
 The Stringybark Express (railway operation ceased from 2002—now a rail trail)
 Victorian Goldfields Railway
 Walhalla Goldfields Railway— gauge.
 Yarra Valley Railway

Western Australia 
 gauge unless otherwise stated.
 Bennett Brook Railway— gauge.
 Carnarvon Jetty Tramway (tramway operation ceased by 2007  - future plans not clear)
 Golden Mile Loop Line Railway, Boulder, Kalgoorlie  (rail operation ceased from 2004) 
 Hotham Valley Railway (incorporating Steam Ranger, Dwellingup Forest Train and Etmilyn Restaurant Train)
 Kojonup Tourist Railway (railway operation suspended from 2018)
 Pemberton Tramway (Tramway operation ceased in 2023)
  Rottnest Island Railway (also known as Oliver Hill Railway)
 Wheatbelt Heritage Rail, Dowerin  (railway not yet operational)
 Whiteman Park Heritage Tramway  gauge.

See also 

List of heritage railways
Western Australian Rail Transport Museum
Newport Railway Museum
Workshops Rail Museum

References

Railways, heritage
Railways, heritage
Australian heritage railways